The 2022 Stuttgart Surge season is the second season of Stuttgart Surge in the European League of Football.

Preseason
On October 22, 2021 the organisation extended the contract with head coach Martin Hanselmann. After further preparation and signings of coaches, the Surge held their open tryout on November 28, 2021 and signed the first player for the 2022 season in December 12, 2021 with former Frankfurt Galaxy Benjamin "Benji" Barnes. With former NCAA Division-II Truman State University football program starting Quarterback Randall Schroeder, the team signed its third American quarterback in their history.

Regular season

Standings

Schedule
 
Source: europeanleague.football

Roster

Transactions
From Frankfurt Galaxy:
 Benjamin Barnes (December 31, 2021)
 Nikolas Knoblauch (January 16, 2022)
 Noah Bomba (February 03, 2022)
 Darnell Minton (March 07, 2022)
 Precious Ogbevoen (March 29, 2022)

Staff

Notes

References 

Stuttgart Surge season
Stuttgart Surge
Stuttgart Surge